Andrew Slattery is an Irish rally car driver who won the Novice Award in 2008.

Slattery, a service manager at Slattery's Garage Puckane, has competed in 4 rounds of the National Tarmac Championship R2 class this year. He recently picked up 3rd place in class in Galway Summer Stages Rally on 1 September. His Peugeot 208 R2 is sponsored by Total S.A., through Irish Distributor, Finol Oils, whilst Gowan Distributors Limited, Peugeot Importers in Ireland has committed to promotional support to run the car in 2013.

References

Irish rally drivers
Irish racing drivers
Motorsport in Ireland
Irish motorsport people
1987 births
Living people
Place of birth missing (living people)